New Zealand is an island country located in the south-western Pacific Ocean, near the centre of the water hemisphere. It consists of a large number of islands, estimated around 700, mainly remnants of a larger land mass now beneath the sea. The land masses by size are the South Island (or Te Waipounamu) and the North Island (or Te Ika-a-Māui), separated by the Cook Strait. Other islands are significantly smaller in area.

New Zealand's landscapes range from the fiord-like sounds of the southern-west to the sandy beaches of the subtropical Far North. The South Island is dominated by the Southern Alps while a volcanic plateau covers much of the central North Island. Temperatures commonly fall below  and rise above  then conditions vary from wet and cold on the South Island's west coast to dry and continental a short distance away across the mountains and to the tundra like climate in the Deep South of Southland.

About two-thirds of the land is economically useful, with the remainder being mountainous. The North Island is the most populous island with 4 million residents, and Auckland being by far the largest metropolitan area in the country by population and urban area. The South Island is the second-most populated island, with over 1.18 million people, but is geographically larger than the North.

Other island groups to the north are New Caledonia, Tonga and Fiji. It is the southernmost nation in Oceania. The relative close proximity of New Zealand to Antarctica has made the South Island a major gateway for scientific expeditions to the continent.

Physical geography

Overview

The land size of  makes it the sixth-largest island country. New Zealand consists of a large number of islands, estimated around 600. The islands give it  of coastline and extensive marine resources. New Zealand claims the ninth largest exclusive economic zone in the world, covering , more than 15 times its land area.

The South Island is the largest land mass of New Zealand, and is the 12th-largest island in the world. The island is divided along its length by the Southern Alps. The east side of the island has the Canterbury Plains while the West Coast is famous for its rough coastlines, high rainfall, very high proportion of native bush (forest), and glaciers.

The North Island is the second-largest island, and the 14th-largest in the world. It is separated from the South Island by the Cook Strait, with the shortest distance being . Much of the surviving forest is located in this belt, and in other mountain areas and rolling hills. The North Island has many isolated volcanic peaks.

Extreme points

The phrase "From Cape Reinga to The Bluff" is frequently used within New Zealand to refer to the extent of the whole country. Cape Reinga / Te Rerenga Wairua is the northwesternmost tip of the Aupouri Peninsula, at the northern end of the North Island. Bluff is Invercargill's port, located near the southern tip of the South Island, below the 46th parallel south. However, the extreme points of New Zealand are actually located in several outlying islands.

The points that are farther north, south, east or west than any other location in New Zealand are as follows:

The northernmost point is in Nugent Island in the Kermadec Islands.
The southernmost point is Jacquemart Island in the Campbell Island group.
The easternmost point is situated in a group of islands within the Chatham Islands called the Forty-Fours.
The westernmost point is Cape Lovitt on Auckland Island.

Antipodes

New Zealand is largely antipodal to the Iberian Peninsula of Europe. The northern half of the South Island corresponds to Galicia and northern Portugal. Most of the North Island corresponds to central and southern Spain, from Valladolid (opposite the southern point of the North Island, Cape Palliser), through Madrid and Toledo to Cordoba (directly antipodal to Hamilton), Lorca (opposite East Cape), Málaga (Cape Colville), and Gibraltar. Parts of the Northland Peninsula oppose Morocco, with Whangārei nearly coincident with Tangiers. The antipodes of the Chatham Islands lie in France, just north of the city of Montpellier. The Antipodes Islands were named for their supposed antipodal position to Britain; although they are the closest land to the true antipodes of Britain, their location 49°41′S 178°48′E is directly antipodal to a point a few kilometres to the east of Cherbourg on the north coast of France.

In Europe the term "Antipodes" is often used to refer to New Zealand and Australia (and sometimes other South Pacific areas), and "Antipodeans" to their inhabitants.

Geology

New Zealand is part of Zealandia, a microcontinent nearly half the size of Australia that gradually submerged after breaking away from the Gondwanan supercontinent. Zealandia extends a significant distance east into the Pacific Ocean and south towards Antarctica. It also extends towards Australia in the north-west. This submerged continent is dotted with topographic highs that sometimes form islands. Some of these, such as the main islands (North and South), Stewart Island, New Caledonia, and the Chatham Islands, are settled. Other smaller islands are eco-sanctuaries with carefully controlled access.

The New Zealand land mass has been uplifted due to transpressional tectonics between the Indo-Australian Plate and Pacific plates (these two plates are grinding together with one riding up and over the other). This is the cause of New Zealand's numerous earthquakes.

To the east of the North Island the Pacific Plate is forced under the Indo-Australian Plate. The North Island of New Zealand has widespread back-arc volcanism as a result of this subduction. There are many large volcanoes with relatively frequent eruptions. There are also several very large calderas, with the most obvious forming Lake Taupō. Taupō has a history of incredibly powerful eruptions, with the Oruanui eruption  26,500 years ago ejecting  of material and causing the downward collapse of several hundred square kilometres to form the lake. The most recent eruption occurred  and ejected at least 100 cubic kilometres of material, and has been correlated with red skies seen at the time in Rome and China. The associated geothermal energy from this volcanic area is used in numerous hydrothermal power plants. Some volcanic places are also famous tourist destinations, such as the Rotorua geysers.

The subduction direction is reversed through the South Island, with the Indo-Australian Plate forced under the Pacific Plate. The transition between these two different styles of continental collision occurs through the top of the South Island. This area has significant uplift and many active faults; large earthquakes are frequent occurrences here. The most powerful in recent history, the M8.3 Wairarapa earthquake, occurred in 1855. Fortunately casualties were low due to the sparse settlement of the region. In 2013, the area was rattled by the M6.5 Seddon earthquake, but this caused little damage and no injuries. New Zealand's capital city, Wellington is situated in the centre of this region.

The subduction of the Indo-Australian Plate drives rapid uplift in the centre of the South Island (approx.  per year). This uplift forms the Southern Alps. These roughly divide the island, with a narrow wet strip to the west and wide and dry plains to the east. The resulting orographic rainfall enables the hydroelectric generation of most of the electricity in New Zealand. A significant amount of the movement between the two plates is accommodated by lateral sliding of the Indo-Australian Plate north relative to the Pacific Plate. This fault has an estimated rupture reoccurrence interval of ~330 years, and last ruptured in 1717 along  of its length. It passes directly under many settlements on the West Coast of the South Island and shaking from a rupture would likely affect many cities and towns throughout the country.

The rapid uplift and high erosion rates within the Southern Alps combine to expose high grade greenschist to amphibolite facies rocks, including the gemstone pounamu. Geologists visiting the West Coast can easily access high-grade metamorphic rocks and mylonites associated with the Alpine Fault, and in certain places can stand astride the fault trace of an active plate boundary. The South Island also has two major goldfields in Otago and the West Coast.

To the south of New Zealand the Indo-Australian Plate is subducting under the Pacific Plate, and this is beginning to result in back-arc volcanism. The youngest (geologically speaking) volcanism in the South Island occurred in this region, forming the Solander Islands (<2 million years old). This region is dominated by the rugged and relatively untouched Fiordland, an area of flooded glacially carved valleys with little human settlement.

Mountains, volcanoes and glaciers

The South Island is much more mountainous than the North, but shows fewer manifestations of recent volcanic activity. The closest mountains surpassing it in elevation are found not in Australia, but in New Guinea and Antarctica. As well as the towering peaks, the Southern Alps include huge glaciers such as Franz Josef and Fox.

The North Island Volcanic Plateau covers much of central North Island with volcanoes, lava plateaus, and crater lakes. The three highest volcanoes are Mount Ruapehu, Mount Taranaki and Mount Ngauruhoe. Ruapehu's major eruptions have historically been about 50 years apart, in 1895, 1945 and 1995–1996. The 1886 eruption of Mount Tarawera, located near Rotorua, was New Zealand's largest and deadliest eruption in the last 200 years, killing over 100 people. Another long chain of mountains runs through the North Island, from Wellington to East Cape. The ranges include Tararua and Kaimanawa.

The lower mountain slopes are covered in native forest. Above this are shrubs, and then tussock grasses. Alpine tundra consists of cushion plants and herbfields; many of these plants have white and yellow flowers.

Caves

New Zealand's cave systems have three main origins, the chemical weathering of limestone by water (karst), lava caves and erosion by waves (sea caves). Therefore, the distribution of limestone, marble (metamorphosed limestone) and volcanoes defines the location of caves in inland New Zealand. The main regions of karst topography are the Waitomo District and Takaka Hill in the Tasman District. Other notable locations are on the West Coast (Punakaiki), Hawke's Bay and Fiordland.

Lava caves (lava tubes) usually form in pāhoehoe lava flows, which are less viscus and typical formed from basalt. When an eruption occurs the outer layer of the lava flow hardens, while the interior remain liquid. The liquid lava flows out as it is insulated by the hardened crust above. These caves are found where there are relatively recent basaltic volcanoes in New Zealand, such as the Auckland Volcanic Field particularly on Rangitoto, Mount Eden and Matukutūruru.

The distribution of sea caves is more sporadic, with their location and orientation being controlled by weakness in the underlying rock. As cave systems take many thousands of years to develop they can now be isolated from the water that formed them, whether through change in sea level or groundwater flow. If as a cave grows it breaks through to the surface somewhere else it becomes a natural arch, like those near Karamea (Oparara Arches).

Rivers and lakes

The proportion of New Zealand's area (excluding estuaries) covered by rivers, lakes and ponds, based on figures from the New Zealand Land Cover Database, is (357526 + 81936) / (26821559 – 92499–26033 – 19216) = 1.6%. If estuarine open water, mangroves, and herbaceous saline vegetation are included, the figure is 2.2%.

The mountainous areas of the North Island are cut by many rivers, many of which are swift and unnavigable. The east of the South Island is marked by wide, braided rivers such as the Wairau, Waimakariri and Rangitata; formed from glaciers, they fan out into many strands on gravel plains. New Zealand's rivers feature hundreds of waterfalls; the most visited set of waterfalls are the Huka Falls that drain Lake Taupō.

Lake Taupō, located near the centre of the North Island, is the largest lake by surface area in the country. It lies in a caldera created by the Oruanui eruption, the largest eruption in the world in the past 70,000 years. There are 3,820 lakes with a surface area larger than one hectare. Many lakes have been used as reservoirs for hydroelectric projects.

Coastal wetlands
Wetlands support the greatest concentration of wildlife out of any other habitat. New Zealand has six sites covering almost  that are included in the List of Wetlands of International Importance (Ramsar sites), including the Whangamarino Wetland.

Climate

The main geographic factors that influence New Zealand's climate are the temperate latitude, with prevailing westerly winds; the oceanic environment; and the mountains, especially the Southern Alps. January and February are the warmest months, July the coldest. New Zealand does not have a large temperature range, apart from central Otago, but the weather can change rapidly and unexpectedly. Near subtropical conditions are experienced in Northland.

The UV index can be very high and extreme in the hottest times of the year in the north of the North Island. This is partly due to the country's relatively little air pollution compared to many other countries and the high sunshine hours. New Zealand has very high sunshine hours with most areas receiving over 2000 hours per year. The sunniest areas are Nelson/Marlborough and the Bay of Plenty with 2,400 hours per year.

The table below lists climate normals for the warmest and coldest months in New Zealand's six largest cities. North Island cities are generally warmest in February. South Island cities are warmest in January.

The combined effects of climate change in New Zealand will result in a multitude of irreversible impacts; by the end of this century New Zealand will experience higher rainfalls, more frequent extreme weather events and higher temperatures. In 2021, the Ministry for the Environment estimated that New Zealand's gross emissions were 0.17% of the world's total gross greenhouse gas emissions. However, on a per capita basis, New Zealand is a significant emitter, the sixth highest within the Annex I countries, whereas on absolute gross emissions New Zealand is ranked as the 24th highest emitter.

Human geography

Political geography
New Zealand has no land borders. However, the Ross Dependency, its claim in Antarctica, notionally borders the Australian Antarctic Territory to the west and unclaimed territory to the east. Most other countries do not recognise territorial claims in Antarctica.

New Zealand proper is divided administratively into sixteen regions: seven in the South Island and nine in the North. They have a physical geographical link with regional boundaries being based largely on drainage basins. Among the regions, eleven are administered by regional authorities (top tier of local government), while five are unitary authorities that combine the functions of regional authorities and those of territorial authorities (second tier). Regional authorities are primarily responsible for environmental resource management, land management, regional transport, and biosecurity and pest management. Territorial authorities administer local roading and reserves, waste management, building consents, the land use and subdivision aspects of resource management, and other local matters.

The Chatham Islands is not a region, although its council operates as a region under the Resource Management Act. There are a number of outlying islands that are not included within regional boundaries. The Kermadecs and the Subantarctic Islands are inhabited only by a small number of Department of Conservation staff.

Population geography

Over the course of the 20th century, New Zealand's population centre drifted north. Today the South Island contains a little under one-quarter of the population. Over three-quarters of New Zealand's population live in the North Island, with half living north of Lake Rotorua, and one-third of the total population living in the Auckland Region. Auckland is also the fastest growing region, accounting for 51% of New Zealand's total population growth (in the two decades up to 2016). The majority of the indigenous Māori people live in the North Island (87%), although a little under a quarter (24%) live in Auckland. New Zealand is a predominantly urban country, with % of the population living in an  urban area. About % of the population live in the 20 main urban areas (population of 30,000 or more) and % live in the four largest cities of Auckland, Christchurch, Wellington, and Hamilton. (Other major urban areas include Tauranga, Dunedin, and Palmerston North.)

New Zealand's peoples have been defined by their immigrant origin, the ongoing process of adaptation to a new land, being changed and changing those who came before. This process has led to a distinct distribution of culture across New Zealand. Here language and religion are used as markers for the far richer concept of culture. These metrics unfortunately exclude the political rural-urban divide and also the full effects of the Christchurch earthquakes on New Zealand's cultural distribution.

New Zealand's most widely spoken language is English (89.8%), however, language, dialect and accent varies spatially both within and between ethnic groups. The Māori language (3.5%) is spoken more commonly in areas with large Māori populations (Gisborne, Bay of Plenty and Northland). There are many sub dialects of Māori, the most pronounced division being between the northern and southern tribes. While migration (typically from north to south) was constant throughout the 16–18th centuries, the south maintained a distinct culture largely due to lack of cultivation possible at that latitude. English is spoken with regional accents relating to the origin of immigrants; for example Scottish and English 19th century immigration in Southland and Canterbury respectively. This has also occurred with more recent immigration, with a wide variety of accents being common in larger cities where immigrant groups have preferentially settled. These immigrant groups change location with time and accents fade over generations.

A wide variety of other languages make up the remaining approximately 6 percent of New Zealanders—with Samoan, Hindi, French and various Chinese dialects being the most common. These minority foreign languages are concentrated in the main cities, particularly Auckland where recent immigration groups have settled.

Agricultural geography 

A relatively small proportion of New Zealand's land is arable (1.76 percent), and permanent crops cover 0.27 percent of the land.  of the land is irrigated. As the world's largest exporter of sheep, New Zealand's agricultural industry focuses primarily on pastoral farming, particularly dairy and beef, as well as lambs. Dairy, specifically, is the top export. In addition to pastoral farming, fisherman harvest mussels, oysters and salmon, and horticulture farmers grow kiwifruit, as well as peaches, nectarines, etc. New Zealand's distance from world markets and spatial variation in rainfall, elevation and soil quality have defined the geography of its agriculture industry.

As of 2007, almost 55 percent of New Zealand's total land area was being used for farming, which is standard compared to most developed countries. Three-fourths of it was pastoral land using for raising sheep, beef, deer, etc. The amount of farmland has decreased since 2002.

New Zealand's isolated location has simultaneously led to fewer pests and an agriculture industry with a greater susceptibility to introduced diseases and pests. A major concern for New Zealand farmers is the rapidly growing wild rabbit population. Wild rabbits have been an agricultural since their introduction to the country in the 1930s. They cause significant damage to farm lands: eating the grass, crops, and causing soil degradation. Many farmers are worried about their livelihoods and the effects that the rabbits will have on food supply and trade, as their numbers are quickly growing out of control. An illegal rabbit-killing virus called the rabbit haemorrhagic disease virus (RHDV) was released in 1997 by a group of vigilante farmers, and was very effective initially. After twenty years, however, the rabbits became immune to it. A new strain of the virus was released in March 2018, a Korean form of the strain called the K5 virus, or RHDV1-K5. This virus was introduced with the goal of exterminating 40 percent of the rabbit population. The new virus works much faster than the last one, expected to kill rabbits within two to four days of exposure. The virus has become a subject of debate among animal rights activists, due to the inhumane manner in which it kills the rabbits. However, farmers unanimously seem to be very grateful for the release of the virus.

Almost half of New Zealand's climate change emissions are generated by greenhouse gases, mainly methane and nitrous oxide, which come from farming and agriculture. Organisms that grow inside of grazing animals' stomachs turn New Zealand's grass into methane. The increase of carbon dioxide in the air helps the plants to grow faster, but the long-term effects of climate change threaten farmers with the likelihood of more frequent and severe floods and droughts. Growers of kiwifruit, a major export in the horticulture industry of New Zealand, have experienced difficulties as a result of climate change. In the 2010s, warm winters did not provide the adequate cool temperatures needed for the flowering of kiwifruit, and this resulted in a reduction of the yield sizes. Droughts have also decreased apple production by causing sunburns and a lack of water available for irrigation. In contrast, the dairy industry has not been affected, and has actually adjusted well to the effects of climate change.

Natural hazards
Flooding is the most regular natural hazard. New Zealand is swept by weather systems that bring heavy rain; settlements are usually close to hill-country areas which experience much higher rainfall than the lowlands due to the orographic effect. Mountain streams which feed the major rivers rise rapidly and frequently break their banks covering farms with water and silt. Close monitoring, weather forecasting, stopbanks, dams, and reafforestation programmes in hill country have ameliorated the worst effects.

New Zealand experiences around 14,000 earthquakes a year, some in excess of magnitude 7 (M7). Since the 2010, several large (M7, M6.3, M6.4, M6.2) and shallow (all <7 km) earthquakes have occurred immediately beneath Christchurch. These have resulted in 185 deaths, widespread destruction of buildings and significant liquefaction. These earthquakes are releasing distributed stress in the Pacific plate from the ongoing collision with the Indo-Australian plate to the west and north of the city. Volcanic activity is most common on the central North Island Volcanic Plateau. Tsunamis affecting New Zealand are associated with the Pacific Ring of Fire.

Droughts are not regular and occur mainly in Otago and the Canterbury Plains and less frequently over much of the North Island between January and April. Forest fires were rare in New Zealand before the arrival of humans. During a designated summer season, lighting a fire in the open is banned on public conservation land.

Environment and ecology

New Zealand's geographic isolation for 80 million years and island biogeography has influenced evolution of the country's species of animals, fungi and plants. Physical isolation has not caused biological isolation, and this has resulted in a dynamic evolutionary ecology with examples of very distinctive plants and animals as well as populations of widespread species. There has been long-distance dispersal of plant life between mainland Australia and New Zealand, despite the  separation. Evergreens such as the giant kauri and southern beech dominate the bush (native forests). The country also has a diverse range of birds, several of which are flightless such as the kiwi (a national symbol), the kākāpō, the takahē and the weka, and several species of penguins. Around 30 bird species are currently listed as endangered or critically endangered. Conservationists recognised that threatened bird populations could be saved on offshore islands, where, once predators were exterminated, bird life flourished again.

Many bird species, including the giant moa, became extinct after the arrival of Polynesians, who brought dogs and rats, and Europeans, who introduced additional dog and rat species, as well as cats, pigs, ferrets, and weasels. Native flora and fauna continue to be hard-hit by invasive species. New Zealand conservationists have pioneered several methods to help threatened wildlife recover, including island sanctuaries, pest control, wildlife translocation, fostering, and ecological restoration of islands and other selected areas.

Massive deforestation occurred after humans arrived, with around half the forest cover lost to fire after Polynesian settlement. Much of the remaining forest fell after European settlement, being logged or cleared to make room for pastoral farming, leaving forest occupying only 23% of the land. New Zealand had a 2019 Forest Landscape Integrity Index mean score of 7.12/10, ranking it 55th globally out of 172 countries.

Pollution, particularly water pollution, is one of New Zealand's most significant environmental issues. Fresh water quality is under pressure from agriculture, hydropower, urban development, pest invasions and climate change, although much of the country's household and industrial waste is now increasingly filtered and sometimes recycled.

Protected areas

Some areas of land, the sea, rivers or lakes are protected by law, so their special plants, animals, landforms and other distinctive features are sheltered from harm. New Zealand has three World Heritage Sites, 13 national parks, 34 marine reserves, and thousands of scenic, historic, recreation and other reserves. The Department of Conservation is responsible for managing 8.5 million hectares of public land (approximately 30% of New Zealand's total land area).

Environmental agreements
New Zealand is party to several multilateral environmental agreements. The major agreements are listed below.

 Antarctic-Environmental Protocol
 Antarctic Treaty
 Basel Convention
 Convention on Biological Diversity
 Convention on International Trade in Endangered Species
 International Convention for the Prevention of Pollution from Ships
 United Nations Convention to Combat Desertification
 London Dumping Convention
 Kyoto Protocol
 Minamata Convention on Mercury
 Environmental Modification Convention

 Nouméa Convention
 Ramsar Convention
 Rotterdam Convention
 United Nations Convention on the Law of the Sea
 International Tropical Timber Agreement, 1994
 Stockholm Convention on Persistent Organic Pollutants
 United Nations Framework Convention on Climate Change
 Vienna Convention for the Protection of the Ozone Layer
 Waigani Convention
 International Convention for the Regulation of Whaling

Popular culture
New Zealand's varied landscape has appeared in television shows, such as Hercules: The Legendary Journeys and Xena: Warrior Princess. An increasing number of feature films have been shot on location in New Zealand for its scenery, including the Lord of the Rings trilogy.

New Zealand is often mistakenly omitted from world maps due to the country's physical geographic isolation, relatively small size (compared to Australia), and its positioning on the extreme bottom-right in many maps projections such as the Mercator. The phenomenon has been popularly referenced and has a dedicated Reddit forum.

See also

 Archaeology of New Zealand
 Natural history of New Zealand
 Geography of South Island
 Geography of North Island

References

External links

 Statistics New Zealand
 New Zealand profile at World Atlas
 Natural Environment – Te Ara: The Encyclopedia of New Zealand
 New Zealand's Geological History – 1966 Encyclopaedia of New Zealand